Joseph Mécène Jean-Louis (born 3 June 1949) is a Haitian judge serving on the Supreme Court of Haiti who was declared interim president by opponents seeking to end the rule of Jovenel Moïse during the 2018–2021 Haitian protests.

References 

Haitian politicians
Living people
1949 births
Haitian judges